The 2002 Individual Ice Speedway World Championship was the 37th edition of the World Championship  The Championship was held as a Grand Prix series over eight rounds.

Classification

See also 
 2002 Speedway Grand Prix in classic speedway
 2002 Team Ice Racing World Championship

References 

Ice speedway competitions
World